Henriëtte Laman Trip-de Beaufort, born Agathe Henriette Maria de Beaufort (13 October 1890 – 26 March 1982), was a Dutch writer. Her work was part of the literature event in the art competition at the 1928 Summer Olympics.

References

1890 births
1982 deaths
20th-century Dutch women writers
Olympic competitors in art competitions
People from Baarn